Abraham Lincoln (1924) is a short film made in the Phonofilm sound-on-film process. The film was directed by J. Searle Dawley, produced by Lee de Forest, is based on the 1918 play Abraham Lincoln by John Drinkwater, and stars Frank McGlynn Sr. as Lincoln. McGlynn also played Lincoln in the play on Broadway.

Although no copies of the film appear to have survived, some photographs have been preserved.

In 1923, de Forest and Dawley produced a short Phonofilm, Lincoln, Man of the People, with Edwin Markham reading his poem of that title. In 1925, de Forest produced a Phonofilm, Memories of Lincoln, with 91-year-old Chauncey Depew giving his recollections of meeting Lincoln in person.

See also
Cultural depictions of Abraham Lincoln

References

External links
 
 Abraham Lincoln (1924) at SilentEra
 Donald Crafton, The Talkies (UC Press, 1999), p. 65

1924 films
Films directed by J. Searle Dawley
Fictional depictions of Abraham Lincoln in film
Films about Abraham Lincoln
Phonofilm short films
American silent short films
American black-and-white films
American films based on plays
1924 lost films
Lost American films
1920s American films